Living Streets may refer to:

Living street, a design methodology for urban areas that aims to reduce the speed of motorized traffic, making spaces more attractive to pedestrians
Living Streets (UK), an advocacy group in the United Kingdom
Living Streets Aotearoa, an advocacy group in New Zealand